This is a list of episodes for the television series Marcus Welby, M.D.

Series overview

Episodes

Pilot (1969)

Season 1 (1969–1970)

Season 2 (1970–1971)

Season 3 (1971–1972)

Season 4 (1972–1973)

Season 5 (1973–1974)

Season 6 (1974–1975)

Season 7 (1975–1976)

TV films

See also
List of Owen Marshall: Counselor at Law episodes

References

External links
 
 
 
 

Marcus Welby, M.D.